Tibesti Est is a departments of Tibesti Region in Chad.  It was created by Ordinance No. 002 / PR / 08 of 19 February 2008.  Its chief town is Bardai .

Subdivisions 
The department of Tibesti Est is divided into 4 sub-prefectures:

 Bardaï
 Zoumri
 Aozou
 Yebbibou

Administration 
List of administrators :

 Prefect of Tibesti Est (since 2008)

 October 9, 2008: Taher Barkai

References 

Departments of Chad